Tour Égée (also known as tour Ernst&Young) is an office skyscraper located in La Défense, the high-rise business district situated west of Paris, France.

Tour Égée was built in 1999 by Michel Andrault and Nicolas Ayoub, architects from Conceptua. A twin of Tour Égée, Tour Adria, was built nearby three years later in 2002. The only difference between both towers consists in their cladding: the one from Adria is darker, while the one from Égée is lighter with a glass cladding giving an interesting feeling of vertical and horizontal stripes crossing at the level of each window. Tour Égée is 155 m (509 ft) tall and has a triangular floorplan.

See also 
 Skyscraper
 La Défense
 List of tallest structures in Paris

External links 
 Tour Égée (Emporis)

Skyscraper office buildings in France
La Défense
Office buildings completed in 1999
1999 establishments in France
Twin towers